Dinagat Island is an island located northeast of Mindanao in the Philippines.

Until December 2006, it was part of the province of Surigao del Norte. Being its main island, almost all municipalities of the province of Dinagat Islands are located on it.

External links
 

Islands of Dinagat Islands